Bayle City is an unincorporated community in South Hurricane Township, Fayette County, Illinois, United States.

References

Unincorporated communities in Fayette County, Illinois
Unincorporated communities in Illinois